Lacrosse was a demonstration sport at the 1948 Summer Olympics in London. Teams from Great Britain and the United States played a single match, which ended in a 5-5 draw.  The match was played in Wembley Stadium. Team USA was composed of Rensselaer Polytechnic Institute team members, while Team GB fielded an all-star team.

Result

Teams

Great Britain
An "All-England" team organized by the English Lacrosse Union represented Great Britain.

J. Buckland
N. R. Coe
A. L. Dennis
J. Fletcher
J. P. Foy
H. J. Ginn
J. Griffiths
J. H. Little
B. C. Makin
H. Prime
R. T. Renshaw
J. Swindells
R. V. Wilson
J. I. Whitehead (Capt.)
R. N. Whittaker
H. Wyatt
R. F. Zimmern

United States
The team from Rensselaer Polytechnic Institute represented the United States.

R. F. Barrows
A. D. Beard
R. Campbell
W. L. Coleman
O. Cook
R. Coons
M. T. Davies
R. Frick
R. Hutcheon
D. E. Jordan (Capt.)
R. E. Koch
C. J. McCann
J. A. Myers
R. E. Powell
R. J. Sneeden
S. W. Spaulding
D. R. Sutton
R. M. Wood

Source:

See also
Federation of International Lacrosse
World Lacrosse Championship

References

1948
1948 Summer Olympics events
1948
1948 in lacrosse
Men's events at the 1948 Summer Olympics